The 204th Air Brigade is a mixed (fighter, transport and training) brigade of the Serbian Air Force and Air Defence.

History
The brigade was formed on 15 November 2006 as successor of 204th Fighter Aviation Regiment of the Air Force of Serbia and Montenegro from units of the former Air Force of Serbia and Montenegro: 204th Fighter Aviation Regiment, 252nd Fighter-Bomber Aviation Squadron, 890th helicopter squadron, 677th transport aviation squadron and one unit of 353rd reconnaissance squadron.

Missions
In peace time, brigade performs the following tasks:
 airspace control
 air reconnaissance
 air transport
 participation in peacekeeping operations and in international military cooperation
 providing support to civil authorities in case of natural disasters, industrial and other accidents and epidemics

In war time, brigade performs the following tasks:
 combat for airspace control
 fire support
 air defence of the territory
 air reconnaissance
 air transport

Structure

The 204th Air Brigade is composed of the following units:
  101st Fighter Squadron "Knights" (equipped with MiG-29SM)
  138th Transport Squadron (equipped with An-26 and Mi-8T, two C-295 to be introduced in 2023)
  252nd Training Squadron "Ušće Wolves" (equipped with G-4M and Lasta 95)
  890th Mixed Helicopter Squadron "Pegasuses" (equipped with Mi-17V-5 and SA341H)
 177th Air Defence Artillery Missile Battalion
 24th Air Technical Battalion
 17th Air Base Security Battalion

Traditions

Heritage
The 204th Air Brigade continues traditions of the famous 6th Fighter Regiment of the Royal Yugoslav Air Force, which distinguished itself in the defense of Belgrade during the 1941 invasion of Yugoslavia in the World War II.

Anniversary
The anniversary of the unit is celebrated on December 2. On that day in 1949, the 204th Fighter Aviation Regiment was formed, which has the longest tradition of all the units that are part of today's brigade, as a continuation of the tradition of the famous 6th Fighter Regiment, which distinguished itself in the defense of Belgrade in 1941.

Patron saint
The unit's slava or its patron saint is Saint Elijah known as Ilindan.

References

Brigades of Serbia
Military units and formations established in 2006